Tupu is a 2D animated television series, developed by the French animation studio Xilam, directed by Xavier Giacometti, featuring the adventures of the fictional New York mayor's son, Norton, with a redheaded girl named Tupu in New York, focusing in Central Park. One series was produced, consisting of twenty-six episodes. The series had great success in numerous countries, being dubbed into languages such as Hebrew, Arabic, Turkish, Russian, German, Dutch, and many others.

The show now is quite rare, and many countries no longer hold rights to the show. ABC in Australia currently has no plans to re-purchase the rights to the series, and only ran the show four times, not in order. In France, Gulli cancelled it only last year, ending on episode 14.

On the 29/03/13, the children's TV channel, KiKa (from ZDF), finished airing the series. They also concluded on episode 14.

No country other than the Netherlands has had DVDs released. No further plans have been made for DVD releases in other countries. There is an online petition to get Tupu released on DVD. ABC no longer holds rights to release DVDs.

An official Facebook website was created for Tupu on 28 May 2013. No information has been posted related to broadcast or DVDs.

Overview
The series revolves around a semi-wild girl named Tupu. Tupu is similar and reminiscent of Mowgli from The Jungle Book, although she retains manners and a basic understanding of English. Tupu lives with her friend, Whatzup, a squirrel, and also spends a lot of time with Norton. Tupu also had befriended all of the animals in the Central Park zoo. Norton lives with his father and has a privileged life, being chauffeured around town, especially to Central Park in a stretch limousine. Tupu is incessantly chased by the Central Park guard, Shoobert Shoobz, who makes every endeavor to prove her existence. Yet he keeps failing in catching her. His unconfirmed claim that a wild girl hides in the park has led people to perceive him as deranged.

Characters

Tupu
A barefoot wild girl who has been raised in Central Park and lives in the big oak tree. She gets along well with Norton and can speak to animals as well as understand them. She is often hunted by Shoobz, but always manages to elude capture. Tupu dislikes anyone who mistreats animals and nature. She is often accompanied by her squirrel friend, Whatzup. She is not known by anyone other than Shoobz or Norton. To everyone else she is just a normal girl from New York, only Norton really knows where she lives. Tupu's parents are never seen or mentioned and no explanation is given for their absence.

Norton
A happy-go-lucky young boy whose father is the mayor of New York City, and is best friends with Tupu. He is one of the few who know Tupu's secret. Norton wants to become an adventurer like his father and mother.
Norton has an affaire with Tupu and in some chapters they are a couple.

Whatzup
Whatzup is Tupu's closest animal friend, is always seen with her, and comes to her aid when she is in trouble. Sometimes Tupu also has to help rescue Whatzup, but what are friends for? Whatzup sometimes is not with Tupu, when she is usually looking for food. Tupu and Whatzup share the same tree. Although he lives in Central Park, Whatzup is a ruddy European squirrel. His name is a pun on "What's Up?".

Schubert
Shoobz is the caretaker of Central Park, and has made it his life goal to capture and prove the existence of Tupu. He lives with his overbearing mother.

Cast

Episodes

Series 1 

Note: The Australian Broadcasting Company did not broadcast the episodes in order; this order is descended from the original French list, however the 2012 re-run of Tupu was ordered accordingly to the original French list. ABC repeated some episodes more than others, the 3 missing episodes to Tupu were only on once.

DVD release and petition
Tupu has been released on DVD in the Netherlands on three volumes. The first two DVDs consisting of four episodes, and the third containing five (half of the series). The only available language track is Dutch. One of the episodes has the wrong episode audio track, belonging to that of the first episode again. The DVDs were released by Bright vision Entertainment and licensed by ZDF.

Online there is a petition to get Tupu released on DVD. There is a need of 10,000 signatures. it is unsure if the number is reached that Xilam will release the entire series or any DVDs at all.

International broadcasts

References

2000s Canadian animated television series
2010s Canadian animated television series
2004 Canadian television series debuts
2012 Canadian television series endings
2004 French television series debuts
2012 French television series endings
2000s French animated television series
2010s French animated television series
Australian Broadcasting Corporation original programming
Canadian children's animated adventure television series
French children's animated adventure television series
Television shows set in New York City
Animated television series about orphans
English-language television shows
French-language television shows
Xilam